Stephanie Rosenthal (born October 19, 1987) is an American former competitive figure skater who came to prominence during the 2006 United States Figure Skating Championships.

Rosenthal's hometown is Salt Lake City, Utah. She began skating at the age of 5 when a friend's mother put her in a group class. Rosenthal's hobbies include playing the piano, snowboarding, and dancing. She teaches and enjoys hip hop dance and sent a video of her dancing along with her college applications. She was accepted early action to Stanford, but is currently attending Yale, Ezra Stiles Class of 2010. Rosenthal also performed as a skating stunt double in the Disney Channel Original Movie Go Figure.

Rosenthal's best finish to date occurred at the 2006 U.S. Championships where she finished 8th overall, earning a total of 147.13 as well as a standing ovation from the crowd. Her finish at Nationals was a considerable improvement over her 14th-place finish the previous year. Rosenthal is known for her unique music and choreography, the latter due in part to her background in dance.

Since the 2006 US Nationals, Stephanie has been invited to skate in "An Evening With Champions." Despite her placing at Nationals qualifying her for international assignments as a member of Team USA, Stephanie has chosen to take the 2006–2007 season off to concentrate on freshman year at Yale.

Her coaches and choreographers are Stewart and Christi Sturgeon and she skates for the Salt Lake City Figure Skating Club.

She recently finished performing in the world premier of Cold as Ice starring Oksana Baiul in Long Island. She is currently coaching and training in Connecticut.

Results

 J = Junior level

References

1987 births
American female single skaters
Living people
Figure skaters from Salt Lake City
21st-century American women